is a railway station on the Kagoshima Main Line operated by JR Kyushu in Chikushino, Fukuoka Prefecture, Japan. It is named after the local Mount Tenpai, on the route of a long distance Kyūshū hiking trail.

Lines

Layout
The station consists of two opposed side platforms serving two tracks.

Adjacent stations

History
The station was opened by JR Kyushu on 11 March 1989 as an added station on the existing Kagoshima Main Line track.

See also 
List of railway stations in Japan

References

External links
Tenpaizan (JR Kyushu)

Railway stations in Fukuoka Prefecture
Railway stations in Japan opened in 1989